Vivi Laurent-Täckholm (7 January 1898, Danderyd – 3 May 1978) was a Swedish botanist and children's book writer, active in Egypt.

Early years and education
Vivi Laurent-Täckholm was the daughter of Dr. Wilhelm Edvard Laurent and Lilly Jenny Karolina Bergstrand. She was the sister of Torbern Laurent and aunt to Torvard C. Laurent. She studied botany at the University of Stockholm and received her degree in 1921. She traveled to the US from 1921 to 1923. In 1926, she married botany professor Gunnar Täckholm (1891-1933). They moved to Egypt the same year and began work on the flora of Egypt.

Career
During World War II, she worked at a newspaper in Stockholm but moved back to Egypt after the war. She became a professor at the University of Cairo in 1946, in Alexandria University in 1947 and again in Cairo in 1948. In 1952, she became Honorary Doctor of Philosophy at the University of Stockholm.

Täckholm built the Botanical Institute at Cairo University. She collected a herbarium, which became the largest in Africa with about 100,000 plants from around the world, especially from Egypt, Lebanon, Arabia and Sudan. Thanks to her Swedish contacts, the Agricultural Academy in Stockholm sent a 700 kg literature library, and Gustaf VI Adolf of Sweden financed the purchase of foreign literature. SIDA donated a microfilm collection of more than half a million pages of books and herbarium specimens. Thanks to the Wallenberg Foundation at the University of Stockholm, the university was able to build up a laboratory for pollen analysis including an electron microscope. During Täckholm's time, the department had about 20 professors and other teachers and over 2,000 students.

Täckholm died during a visit to Sweden and is buried at Uppsala Old Cemetery.

Selected works

Vivis resa. Ett år som piga från New York till San Francisco, 1923
  Vivis resa II. Från Saltsjöbaden till Pacifikens stränder, 1924
Sagan om Snipp, Snapp, Snorum (1926)
  En skolflicka berättar, 1927
Katt: en kärlekssaga berättad och tecknad, 1936
Som husmor i Egypten, 1937
Bättre än svarta börsen: Vivi berättar hur hon lever gott och riktigt på kupongerna. Utg. av Husmodern. [Recepten av Capucine. Illustr. av Gunila Stierngranat], 1942
  Husmoderns blomsterlexikon, vol I o II, 1946
  Hemmet blommar, en liten handbok i krukväxtodling, 1949
Faraos blomster: en kulturhistorisk-botanisk skildring av livet i Gamla Egypten, 1951
Våra hav: En bok för stora och små, bilder av Veronica Leo, 1978 
Öknen blommar, 1969
Lillans resa till månen: En saga för stora och små, bilder av Veronica Leo, 1976 
Egypten i närbild, 1964
Sagans minareter: En bok om islam, 1971
Levande forntid: Strövtåg i Kairomuseet, 1967
Egyptisk vardag, 1966  
Faraos barn: Kopterna i Egypten, 1965 
Students Flora of Egypt. 2:a utgåvan tryckt i Beirut 1974. Publ. av Universitetet i Kairo. En grön "bibel" på 888 sidor!

Literature 
Irma Ridbäck: Vivi Täckholm - botanist och kulturinstitution, 1994
Beata Arnborg: Professor Vivi - den sagolika botanisten, Bokförlaget Atlantis, Stockholm 2008,

References

Bibliography

See also
Dr Waheeb speaking of Vivi Laurent-Täckholm (Swedish).

Further reading 
 

1898 births
1978 deaths
20th-century Swedish botanists
20th-century Swedish writers
20th-century Swedish women scientists
20th-century Swedish women writers
Swedish children's writers
Swedish women children's writers
Swedish women botanists
Academic staff of Cairo University
Stockholm University alumni
People from Danderyd Municipality
Burials at Uppsala old cemetery
Swedish expatriates in Egypt